Institut Superieur des Etudes et Recherches Islamique is a university and centre for Islamic research in Nouakchott, Mauritania. It is located adjacent (south) to the Lycée d'Arabe.

References

Nouakchott
Universities in Mauritania